Iridium disulfide is the binary inorganic compound with the formula IrS2.  Prepared by the direct reaction of the elements, the compound adopts the pyrite crystal structure at high pressure.  At normal atmospheric pressures, an orthorhombic polymorph is observed..  The high- and low-pressure forms both feature octahedral Ir centers, but the S–S distances are pressure dependent. Although not practical, IrS2 is a highly active catalyst for hydrodesulfurization.

References 

Disulfides
Iridium compounds
Transition metal dichalcogenides